Kang Kuk-chol (born 29 September 1999) is a North Korean footballer who currently plays as a defender for Rimyongsu.

Career statistics

International

References

External links
 
 Kang Kuk-chol at DPRKFootball

1999 births
Living people
North Korean footballers
North Korea international footballers
North Korea youth international footballers
Association football defenders
Rimyongsu Sports Club players
Footballers at the 2018 Asian Games
2019 AFC Asian Cup players
Asian Games competitors for North Korea